Noor Pur is a village of the Tehsil and District of Toba Tek Singh, Punjab, Pakistan. Its full name is Chak # 331 GB Noor Pur. This village is 12 km from Pir Mahal, a town of Kamalia (Tehsil of Toba Tek Singh District). Its neighborhood villages are Chak # 330 GB., Chak # 332 GB Jakhara Chak # 333 GB Fridabad. Leading families of Noor Pur include "Chobarey walas" and others.
Edited By Mr.Waqas Ahmed (Author)

Villages in Toba Tek Singh District